Oluwaseyi Akerele, popularly known as Shizzi, is a Nigerian platinum record producer, disk jockey and songwriter.

Music career

2009–2015: Early life and career
Shizzi started out as a drummer in church. He achieved recognition for his work on Davido's 2011 single "Dami Duro", and produced six songs on the singer's debut album Omo Baba Olowo (2012). He produced Wizkid's "Love My Baby", a song from the artist's debut studio album Superstar (2011). He has been credited for producing "Skelewu" and "Gobe". He was also the producer behind Wande Coal's highly controversial songs "Baby Face" and "Go Low". Shizzi has worked with Sasha, Harrysong, OD Woods, Naeto C, Sauce Kid, Wande Coal, Wizkid, D'Prince, May D, Danagog, Emmy Gee, Skuki, DaBaby, Chris Brown, and Fireboy DML, among others.

In 2013, he co-produced Davido's "Tchelete" with Uhuru/dj maphorisa featuring Mafikizolo. On 26 June 2014, Shizzi worked alongside Davido, Tiwa Savage, Lola Rae, Sarkodie, Diamond Platnumz and Mi Casa to produce MultiChoice's Africa Rising campaign song. In 2015, he demonstrated how to make a hit, alongside Davido at NEC Live masterclass.

2016-19:Sony Publishing, Magic Fingers, and   The Lion King: The Gift documentary 
In 2016, he signed a publishing deal with Sony/ATV Music Publishing as a record producer and a songwriter. Late 2016, Shizzi unveiled his record label and management company well known as Magic Fingers with his first signee Teni on 23 December 2019 after the official release of her single "Amen". In 2019, he appeared in a documentary for Beyonce's soundtrack album The Lion King: The Gift. The documentary aired on 16 September on ABC; in it, he spoke about recording songs for the album.

2020–present:The Battle of Hits session, Feud, and Sony publishing deal terminated
In 2020, he teamed up with Sarz for a 2-hour live stream session, titled "The Battle of Hits", on Instagram. On the showoff, they played their biggest hits, with some unreleased songs. Notable viewers who were active on their live are: Timbaland, Swizz Beatz, Wizkid, Don Jazzy, Davido, Spinall, Kel-P, and Tiwa Savage, among others. In 2021, Shizzi replied to Teni's tweet, on how she departed from his imprint, after achieving prominence through him, without acknowledging his impact on her career, after using him, he wrote.

On 27 April 2022, he announced the end of his six years obsolete publishing deal with Sony/ATV Music Publishing, however, he tweeted, “As of late last year, SonyATV said they were going to let him go only if Efe Ogbeni agrees with terms of termination the contract”, which his ex-manager Efe Ogbeni declined. Shizzi also added, that “his deal with Sony ATV, was a non-favorable deal because Ogbeni never gave him the chance to choose his own attorney to properly inspect the contract back in 2016, he wrote in his post.

Personal life

Controversies
On 16 January 2016, Shizzi accused "Tunde Ednut" & "Masterkraft" for stealing his instrumental to make his song Kosowo  which is produced by Masterkraft.

Discography

Accolades

References 

Living people
Nigerian hip hop record producers
Nigerian songwriters
People from Ibadan
Yoruba musicians
Yoruba-language writers
1984 births